Clarion is a borough in and the county seat of Clarion County, Pennsylvania, United States. Clarion was settled in 1839 and incorporated in 1841. In the past, the surrounding area produced natural gas, oil, lumber and coal. The population was 2,004 in 1900, 2,864 in 1910, and 3,931 at the 2020 census, down from 5,276 at the 2010 census. It is home to the annual Autumn Leaf Festival and Clarion University of Pennsylvania. The county courthouse was added to the National Register of Historic Places in 1979.

Geography
Clarion is located slightly northeast of the center of Clarion County at  (41.211791, -79.384005), in the Allegheny Plateau region of western Pennsylvania.

U.S. Route 322 passes through the borough as Main Street, leading northwest  to Franklin and southeast  to Brookville.

Climate 
Clarion has a humid continental climate (Köppen Dfb), with warm summers and cold to very cold, snowy winters. Snow usually falls between October and April.

Demographics

As of the census of 2000, there were 6,185 people, 2,000 households, and 718 families residing in the borough. The population density was 4,142.8 people per square mile (1,602.7/km2). There were 2,192 housing units at an average density of 1,468.2 per square mile (568.0/km2). The racial makeup of the borough was 94.55% White, 3.48% African American, 0.08% Native American, 0.99% Asian, 0.15% from other races, and 0.76% from two or more races. Hispanic or Latino of any race were 0.82% of the population.

There were 2,000 households, out of which 15.0% had children under the age of 18 living with them, 25.3% were married couples living together, 8.6% had a female householder with no husband present, and 64.1% were non-families. 38.6% of all households were made up of individuals, and 11.7% had someone living alone who was 65 years of age or older. The average household size was 2.17 and the average family size was 2.75. versus $20,214 for females. The per capita income for the borough was $10,832. About 18.8% of families and 41.2% of the population were below the poverty line, including 27.1% of those under age 18 and 7.2% of those age 65 or over.

Borough council 

Clarion is governed by an elected, seven member Borough Council. Current council members include President Carol Lapinto, Vice President Benjamin Aaron, Brenda Sanders Dede, President Pro Tem Rachel Roberts, Rose Logue, Zachary Garbarino, and Keaton MacBeth. Jennifer Fulmer Vinson is Mayor.  Notable funeral director and former United States Marine, William "Mad Dog" Keatley is also from Clarion. He wants tourist to know that his bedroom of his childhood home was located in the dark part of the basement far away from other family members. This was due to his "weirdness" during those teenage years.

Notable people

 Kurt Angle, American Olympic Gold Medalist - Clarion University graduate heavyweight wrestler
 Clara Rankin Coblentz, social reformer
 Emmet Heidrick, baseball player
 Jim Kelly, Football Hall of Fame Inductee 2002 - Professional quarterback for the Buffalo Bills
 Chris Kirkpatrick, NSYNC singer
 Ernest M. Skinner, pipe organ builder

References

External links

 Clarion Borough official website
 Clarion Area Chamber of Business & Industry

County seats in Pennsylvania
Populated places established in 1839
Boroughs in Clarion County, Pennsylvania
1839 establishments in Pennsylvania